Thiago Ribeiro Lacerda (born 19 January 1978) is a Brazilian actor.

Biography 
Lacerda spent his childhood between Rio de Janeiro, where he was born, and Recreio, a mining town where his grandparents lived. From the age of three to 16, he devoted himself to swimming, winning more than 170 medals. Convinced that it would be very difficult to make a living in the sport, he abandoned the idea of becoming a professional swimmer and started to make breaks as a model, besides working as a salesman for a clothing store. He attended a course of interpretation to get rid of shyness, which he felt would hinder his career as manager of a bank. He was ashamed of his 1.95 meters in height, confessing, "I thought that everybody was looking at me."

Thiago was studying Business Administration at UERJ when he received an invitation to test for the part of a professor of swimming in Malhação. He resolved to take the risk and was awarded the role. After finishing recording the first scene, he felt he had discovered what he wanted to do in life.

Two years later, the actor appeared as protagonist of the novela Terra Nostra, in which he played Matteo, an Italian immigrant who came to Brazil seeking a better life. Not only did Thiago conquer the actress Ana Paula Arósio in the series, but he conquered all of Brazil and became the leading actor of the Globo network. After his success as Matheo, he participated in the miniseries Aquarela do Brasil and the novelas As Filhas da Mãe and O Beijo do Vampiro. In 2003, he was invited to live the role of Giuseppe Garibaldi in the miniseries A Casa das Sete Mulheres. The actor considered the role a real gift, because, since the time of Terra Nostra, he had studied and admired the life of the Italian revolutionary.

But Thiago realized that success and fame also have their down side. Hounded by paparazzi and gossip media, he sued the journalist and presenter Leão Lobo and Gugu Liberato, who wore swimwear in a program called Domingo Legal claiming to be the actor - and won both cases. "Gossip cannot interfere with the mechanism which governs each and every aspect: respect. If the person does not give me respect, I can do one of two things: either be full of 'porrada' or be civilized. I choose always to be civilized. I think after the measures they took, I learned to be respected."

Personal life
Thiago is married to the actress Vanessa Lóes, and they have one son, Gael, and two daughters: Cora and Pilar.

Filmography

Television 
 1997 - Malhação ... Lula
 1998 - Hilda Furacão ... Aramel
 1998 - Pecado Capital ... Vicente
 1999 - Terra Nostra ... Matteo Batistela
 2000 - Aquarela do Brasil  ... Mário Lopes
 2001 - As Filhas da Mãe ... Adriano Araújo
 2002 - O Beijo do Vampiro ... Beto / Conde Rogério
 2002 - Sítio do Picapau Amarelo ... Hans Staden
 2003 - A Casa das Sete Mulheres  ... Giuseppe Garibaldi
 2003 - Celebridade ... Otávio Albuquerque
 2004 - Sob Nova Direção ... Pedro (episode: "Pau Pra Toda Obra")
 2004 - Quem vai ficar com Mário? ... Mário
 2005 - América ... Alexander Camargo "Alex"
 2006 - Páginas da Vida .... Jorge Fragoso Martins de Andrade
 2007 - Eterna Magia ... Conrado O'Neill
 2009 - Viver a Vida ... Bruno Marcondes
 2010 - S.O.S. Emergência ... Júnior (episode: "Cartas na mesa")
 2010 - As Cariocas ... Silvinho (episode: "A Iludida de Copacabana")
 2011 - Os Caras de Pau ... Himself (episode: "Namoro: que seja de Terno enquanto dure")
 2011 - Cordel Encantado ... Rei Teobaldo
 2011 - A Vida da Gente ... Dr. Lúcio Pereira
 2013 - A Grande Família .... Himself (episode: "O Duelo")
 2013 - Joia Rara .... Antônio "Toni" Baldo
 2014 - O Tempo e o Vento .... Capitão Rodrigo Cambará
 2014 - Alto Astral . .. Marcos Bittencourt
 2016 - A Lei do Amor .... Ciro Noronha
 2018 - Orgulho e Paixão .... Darcy Williamson

Film 
(2002) A Paixão de Jacobina - (The Passion of Jacobina)
(2003) Sinbad: Legend of the Seven Seas - (Sinbad: Legend of the Seven Seas)
(2004) Irmãos de Fé - (Soul Brothers)
(2006) Se Eu Fosse Você - (If I Were You)
(2006) Muito Gelo e Dois Dedos D'água - (Much Ice and a Tad of Water)
(2010) Segurança Nacional - (National Security)
(2010) MegaMind - (MegaMind)
(2013) O Tempo e o Vento - (Time and the Wind)
(2014) Confissões de Adolescente
(2014) The Book of Life - (The Book of Life)
(2016) The Jungle Book - (The Jungle Book)

References

External links 

1978 births
Living people
Male actors from Rio de Janeiro (city)
Brazilian people of Portuguese descent
Brazilian male telenovela actors
Brazilian male film actors
Rio de Janeiro State University alumni
21st-century Brazilian male actors